"Les Rois du monde" is a 2000 song performed by Philippe d'Avilla, Damien Sargue and Grégori Baquet. It was the second single from the French musical Roméo et Juliette, de la Haine à l'Amour, featuring as the fourth track on the album of the same name. Released in July 2000, the single achieved a huge success in France and Belgium, topping the charts for many months.

Lyrics and music
The song was written and the music composed by Gérard Presgurvic.

Elia Habib, a specialist of the French charts, commented on this song: "its refrain, bewitching choirs chiselled in its words as much as in its melody," compensating for "the tasteless of the performance" and "the clumsiness of some of its verses."

In 2001, "Les Rois du monde" won a NRJ Music Awards in the category 'Francophone song of the year.'

In 2003, the song was covered by Marc Lavoine, MC Solaar, Pierre Palmade and Dany Brillant. It features as sixth track on the album La Foire aux Enfoirés, released on 24 February 2003.

Chart performances
In France, "Les Rois du monde" debuted at number 30 on the French Singles Chart on 29 July 2000 and reached number one in its fifth week, where it stayed for 17 not consecutive weeks, thus blocking Alizée's most successful single "Moi... Lolita" from the top position for thirteen weeks. It totalled 22 weeks in the top ten, 36 weeks in the top 50 and 40 weeks on the chart (top 100). It was certified Diamond disc by the Syndicat National de l'Édition Phonographique.

In Belgium (Wallonia), the single went to number 27 on the Ultratop 40 Singles Chart on 12 August 2000, reached the top ten the week after and became number one two weeks later. It remained at the top for 14 consecutive weeks and spent 22 weeks in the top ten and 32 on the chart (top 40). As in France, the single was the second best-selling single of the year, behind "Ces Soirées-là," by Yannick, although this song spent less weeks at number-one.

In Switzerland, the single charted for 23 weeks from 24 September 2000, peaking at number nine in its fourth week and stayed for 11 weeks in the top 20. The song was also released in the Netherlands, but in July 2001. It ranked on the Dutch Top 40 for four weeks, in the bottom of the chart.

Track listings
 CD single
 "Les Rois du monde" — 3:26
 "Un Jour" by Damien Sargue and Cécilia Cara — 3:44

Charts and sales

Peak positions

Year-end charts

Certifications

References

2000 singles
Ultratop 50 Singles (Wallonia) number-one singles
SNEP Top Singles number-one singles
Songs from musicals
Damien Sargue songs
2000 songs
Mercury Records singles